Pavel Aleksandrovich Trenikhin (born 24 March 1986) is a Russian sprint athlete. He was born in Serov.

International competitions

References

 

1986 births
Living people
People from Serov
Sportspeople from Sverdlovsk Oblast
Russian male sprinters
Olympic male sprinters
Olympic athletes of Russia
Athletes (track and field) at the 2012 Summer Olympics
World Athletics Championships athletes for Russia
European Athletics Championships winners
European Athletics Championships medalists
Russian Athletics Championships winners
21st-century Russian people